Kŭmgol station is a railway station in Kŭmgol 1-dong, greater Tanch'ŏn city, South Hamgyŏng province, North Korea, on the Kŭmgol Line of the Korean State Railway. It was opened in 1961.

A trolleybus line formerly ran from next to the railway station to Kumgol 3-dong serving the Komdok mining area, though no trolleybuses have run since 2011 and the loop line next to the station has been dismantled around or before 2015.

References

Railway stations in North Korea